Ankhesenpepi (Ankhesenpepy, Ankhenespepi, Ankhenespepy) was the name of four queen consorts during the sixth dynasty of Egypt. The name means “Her life belongs to Pepi”. Two of them were married to Pharaoh Pepi I (whose throne name was Meryre; these two ladies were also known as Ankhesenmeryre), the other two were married to Pharaoh Pepi II.

 Ankhesenpepi I, wife of Pepi I, mother of Merenre Nemtyemsaf
 Ankhesenpepi II, wife of Pepi I, mother of Pepi II
 Ankhesenpepi III, daughter of Nemtyemsaf, wife of Pepi II
 Ankhesenpepi IV, wife of Pepi II, possible mother of Neferkara I

Ancient Egyptian given names
Egyptian feminine given names